Incheon International Airport Corporation (IIAC) was established in 1991 to operate the Incheon International Airport in Incheon, South Korea.

References

External links 

Incheon International Airport
Airport operators
Transport operators of South Korea
Government-owned companies of South Korea
Transport companies established in 1991
South Korean companies established in 1991
Companies based in Incheon